Jin Mao may refer to:
Jin Mao Tower
Jin Mao (deputy commander), Deputy Commander-in-Chief of the People's Liberation Army Navy